Julie Forman-Kay   is a scientist at the Hospital for Sick Children (SickKids) and professor at University of Toronto. Her research focuses on the dynamics, interactions, structures, and functions of intrinsically disordered proteins.

Early life and career 

Forman-Kay obtained a degree in Chemistry from the Massachusetts Institute of Technology in 1985. She carried out her graduate studies at Yale University in the laboratory of Fred M. Richards. She also worked at the National Institutes of Health in the lab of Angela Gronenborn and Marius Clore.

Forman-Kay joined the Hospital for Sick Children in 1992, where she is currently a Program Head and Senior Scientist and Senior Scientist in the Molecular Medicine program. Furthermore she is also the Co-Director of the Structural & Biophysical Core Facility. Forman-Kay is also currently a Professor in the Department of Biochemistry, at University of Toronto.

Research 

Forman-Kay's research focuses on structural, functional, and bioinformatic studies of intrinsically disordered proteins using a combination of computational and experimental approaches. Her research has characterised the dynamic complexes of many disordered proteins and their ability to undergo liquid-liquid phase separation. Forman-Kay has developed a software tool called ENSEMBLE which uses experimental data from Nuclear Magnetic Resonance spectroscopy and Small-angle X-ray scattering to predict the conformations that represent the structural ensembles of disordered proteins.

Awards 

In 2016, Forman-Kay was elected as Fellow of the Royal Society of Canada in 2016.

In 2021, Forman-Kay was elected as a Fellow of the Royal Society.

Personal life 

Forman-Kay is married to biochemist Lewis Kay and has two children. Forman-Kay is also a violinist and plays classical chamber music.

References 

Fellows of the Royal Society
Fellows of the Royal Society of Canada
Academic staff of the University of Toronto
Yale Graduate School of Arts and Sciences alumni
Living people
Canadian biochemists
Women biophysicists
Year of birth missing (living people)